Caroline Ardelia Yale (September 29, 1848 – July 2, 1933) was an American inventor and educator who revolutionized the teaching of hearing-impaired students. A collaborator of Alexander Graham Bell, her phonetic system became the most widely used in America. She was also Director and cofounder of the Alexander Graham Bell Association for the Deaf and Hard of Hearing.

Biography 

Caroline Ardelia Yale was born September 29, 1848, in Charlotte, Vermont, where she lived until the age of ten.  She then moved to Williston, Vermont, and was educated at home by tutors with the support of her parents. Her father was the President of the American Association to Promote the Teaching of Speech to the Deaf. She also attended schools in Williston, and from 1866 to 1868 she attended Mount Holyoke Seminary (which became Mount Holyoke College). 

After completing her education she taught in schools in Brandon, Vermont, and Williston, Vermont, until 1870, when she began to work at the Clarke School for the Deaf in Northampton, Massachusetts. In 1873 she achieved the rank of associate principal, staying in that position until 1886, when she succeeded Harriet B. Rogers as the principal of the school. Although Harriet Burbank Rogers was the initial founder of the Clarke Institution, it was Caroline Yale who emerged as the institutional leader of the oral movement.

Caroline Yale worked for 63 years at the Clarke School for Hearing and Speech, including 36 years as principal.  In 1882 she began to collaborate with another teacher to develop a more comprehensive system of phonetic symbols than Alexander Melville Bell’s "Visible Speech.”  Together they developed the “Northampton Vowel and Consonant Charts”, which she described in detail in her pamphlet Formation and Development of Elementary English Sounds, 1892. She also collaborated with Alexander Graham Bell and his father, Alexander Melville Bell, on the development of her phonetic system and teaching methods. This became the most widely used system in America. 

In 1889 she established a teacher training department at Clarke School for the Deaf that had sent teachers to schools for the deaf in 31 states and 9 foreign countries before her death in Northampton on July 2, 1933. In 1919, she is featured as the Principal and one of the original corporators of that institution, along with Alexander Graham Bell, U.S. President Calvin Coolidge, President of National Geographic Society Gilbert Hovey Grosvenor, Inventor George Crompton, and President of Massachusetts Bar John C. Hammond.

Her methods became so widespread that by 1933 all but 2 of the 200 schools for the hearing impaired in America employed her oral teaching methods. At the Clarke School, she also developed programs for physical skills and athletics for hearing-impaired children. She hired Grace Goodhue of Burlington, Vermont, as a teacher who then became First Lady Grace Coolidge when she married U.S. President Calvin Coolidge.  Grace Coolidge remained a lifelong fund raiser and strong supporter of the Clarke School.

In 1890 she helped organize the Alexander Graham Bell Association for the Deaf and Hard of Hearing, and became the director. She also served for 25 years on the Northampton School Committee before retiring from her position as principal of the Clarke School in 1922.  After retiring she continued to direct the teacher training program and remained active with the Clarke School for many years. She received honorary doctorate degrees from Illinois Wesleyan University in 1896 and Mount Holyoke College in 1927.

She published an autobiography, Years of Building-Memories of a Pioneer in a Special Field of Education.

The crater Yale on the planet Venus is named in her honor.

See also
 Jeanette Berglind

References

External links 
 Encyclopædia Britannica - Caroline Yale

1933 deaths
1848 births
19th-century American educators
Mount Holyoke College alumni